The Vimānārcanākalpa is a 10th to 11th century text on Hatha yoga, attributed to the sage Marichi.

Text

The Vimanarcanakalpa is a 10th to 11th century prose text on Hatha yoga, attributed to the sage Marichi. It states that yoga is the union of the individual with the supreme self. 

It is one of the earliest texts to describe a non-seated asana and to call such postures asanas (the term originally and literally meaning a seat), namely Mayurasana the peacock pose. In chapter 96 it describes nine asanas in all (Brahmasana, Svastikasana, Padmasana, Gomukhasana, Simhasana, Muktasana, Virasana, Bhadrasana, and Mayurasana), some 500 years before the Hatha Yoga Pradipika. Its account of Mayurasana, in James Mallinson's translation, is:

The text teaches a method of pratyahara, withdrawal using the breath, which is raised through 18 stages called marmans, vital points.

The Vimanarcanakalpa describes other topics, such as the practice of burying sacred bronze objects to protect them in times of trouble.

Notes

References

Sources

Primary

Secondary

 

Sanskrit texts
Hindu texts
Hatha yoga texts